Sheikh Salman bin Ibrahim Al Khalifa (born 2 November 1965) is a member of the House of Khalifa, the royal family of Bahrain. He has been president of the Asian Football Confederation (AFC) since 2 May 2013. Before becoming president of AFC, he was president of Bahrain Football Association (BFA) (2002–13) and also Chairman of the Asian Football Confederation Disciplinary Committee, and Deputy Chairman of the FIFA Disciplinary Committee. He is a member of the FIFA Council and chairman of the FIFA Development Committee.

Biography
Salman is the second son of Ibrahim bin Hamad al-Khalifa and Aisha bint Salman al-Khalifa, daughter of Salman bin Hamad Al Khalifa I, the ruler of Bahrain from 1942 until his death in 1961.

He graduated from the University of Bahrain in 1992 with a bachelor's degree in English Literature and History. Salman has been involved in football for many years, dating back to the early 1980s when he played a few years in the youth team of Bahrain Division I team, Riffa Club.

Since leaving Riffa Club to focus on his academic studies, Salman has held executive positions at the BFA. In 1996, he became chairman of the national team. In 1998, he was elected vice-president of the BFA, and president in 2002. His tenures also include co-chairman of the disciplinary Committee of the FIFA World Cups, the FIFA Beach Tournaments, the FIFA Club Championships, etc. He was also deputy chairman of the FIFA disciplinary committee at Beijing in 2008.

Salman was president of the Bahrain Football Association at time of the "golden era" of Bahraini football. The national team was a match away from qualifying to the 2006 FIFA World Cup and 2010 FIFA World Cup. The team also managed to reach the 2004 Asian Cup semi final, the furthest the national team has ever reached in the continental championship. The national team FIFA ranking also reached its highest in the history of Bahraini Football, as it moved up to the 44th position.

In May 2013, Salman was elected president of the Asian Football Confederation. On 15 October 2015, he announced his candidature for president of FIFA after the election of February 2016. He was defeated by UEFA general secretary Gianni Infantino. On April 6, 2019, Salman was elected unopposed for a second full term as AFC President for the term 2019–2023.

He was again reelected for another term as AFC President in 2023-2027.

Personal life 
Salman has three children, two daughters and a son.

References

1965 births
Living people
Salman Bin Ibrahim
Bahraini footballers
Bahraini football chairmen and investors
University of Bahrain alumni
Association football executives
Presidents of the Asian Football Confederation
Association footballers not categorized by position